Bifrenaria harrisoniae is a species of orchid native to Brazil.

Synonyms
chronological

alphabetical

harrisoniae
Orchids of Brazil